Kevin John Edusei (born 5 August 1976) is a German conductor. He is in his eighth and final season as Chief Conductor of Munich Symphony Orchestra, and from the 2022/2023 season will be Principal Guest Conductor of Fort Worth Symphony Orchestra.

Biography

Early life
Edusei is of mixed Ghanaian and German ancestry, with a Ghanaian physician father, and a German historian, theologian, and pastor mother.  His maternal grandmother, Antonie Wingels, was an opera singer with the Theater Bielefeld.  He learned piano as a child, and subsequently changed his musical study interests to percussion. At age 14, he became a percussionist with the youth orchestra in Ostwestfalen-Lippe.  He studied percussion, sound engineering, and conducting at the Berlin University of the Arts.  He continued his formal academic music studies at the Royal Conservatory of The Hague, where his teachers included Jac van Steen and Ed Spanjaard.

In the USA, Edusei held a 3-month conducting scholarship at the 2004 Aspen Music Festival, where David Zinman served as a mentor.  He was one of three participants in the 2007 Lucerne Festival Academy conducting class, under the guidance of Pierre Boulez and Péter Eötvös.  He was a first-prize recipient in the 2008 Dimitri Mitropoulos Conducting Competition. His other conducting mentors included Marc Albrecht, Kurt Masur, and Sylvain Cambreling.

Early career
From 2004, Edusei served as First Kapellmeister, and subsequently Deputy Generalmusikdirektor, at the Theater Bielefeld.  From 2007 to 2011, he was First Kapellmeister at the Staatstheater Augsburg.  He also served on the conducting staff of the Deutsches Nationaltheater Weimar for 2 years.

Career in Europe
In May 2013, Edusei was named chief conductor of the Munich Symphony Orchestra, effective with the 2014-2015 season.  In June 2016, this contract was extended through the 2021-2022 season. 

Edusei also served as principal guest conductor of the Konzert Theater Bern, and subsequently became Chief Conductor from 2015-2019. During his tenure, he led new productions of Peter Grimes, Salome, Bluebeard's Castle, Tannhäuser, Tristan und Isolde, Káťa Kabanová and a cycle of the Da Ponte operas. Other opera productions conducted during this time included a staged production of Verdi's Requiem with Hamburg State Opera in 2018, Tosca with Staatsoper Hannover in 2019, and The Marriage of Figaro with English National Opera in 2020.

Edusei made his conducting debut at The Proms with the Chineke! Orchestra in August 2017.  He conducted the Chineke! Orchestra in its first commercial recording, for the Signum label. Other major orchestra guest appearances in Europe have included Rotterdam Philharmonic, Scottish Chamber Orchestra, BBC Scottish Symphony Orchestra, London Symphony Orchestra, Radio Filharmonisch Orkest, Deutsche Radio Philharmonie, and Royal Scottish National Orchestra.

Career in the United States
Edusei first guest-conducted the Fort Worth Symphony Orchestra (FWSO) in September 2021.  In December 2021, the FWSO announced his appointment as its next principal guest conductor, effective with the 2022-2023 season, with an initial contract of 3 years.

Guest appearances in 2021/22 season
Edusei makes appearances with the following orchestras in the 2021/22 season:

City of Birmingham Symphony Orchestra
Ensemble Resonanz
Royal Liverpool Philharmonic
Royal Philharmonic Orchestra
Dallas Symphony Orchestra
Essen Philharmonic
BBCSSO/RSNO

Chineke! Orchestra
Juilliard Orchestra at Alice Tully Hall
Indianapolis Symphony Orchestra
Baltimore Symphony Orchestra
Minnesota Orchestra
Berlin Radio Symphony Orchestra
Aspen Festival

Recordings

References

External links
 Official website of Kevin John Edusei
 Intermusica agency page on Kevin John Edusei

 

German male conductors (music)
1976 births
Living people
Musicians from Bielefeld
21st-century German conductors (music)
21st-century German male musicians